Danil Kuraksin (born 4 April 2003) is an Estonian professional footballer who currently plays as a winger for Meistriliiga club Flora and the Estonia national team.

International career
Kuraksin made his senior international debut for Estonia on 12 January 2023, in a 1–0 victory over Finland in a friendly.

Honours

Club
Flora
Meistriliiga: 2022

References

External links

2003 births
Living people
Footballers from Tallinn
Estonian footballers
Association football wingers
Esiliiga B players
Esiliiga players
Meistriliiga players
FC Puuma Tallinn players
JK Tallinna Kalev players
FC Flora players
Estonia youth international footballers
Estonia under-21 international footballers
Estonia international footballers
Estonian people of Russian descent